Alexander Burns Shand, 1st Baron Shand PC (13 December 1828 – 6 March 1904), was a Scottish advocate and judge. He was a Lord of Session between 1872 and 1890 and a Lord of Appeal in Ordinary between 1892 and his death in 1904.

Background and education
Shand was the son of Alexander Shand, of Aberdeen, and Louisa (née Whyte). He studied law at the University of Edinburgh.

Legal and judicial career
Shand was called to the Scottish Bar in 1853 and was an Advocate Depute at the High Court of Justiciary between 1860 and 1862. He was made Sheriff of Kincardine in 1862 and Sheriff of Haddington and Berwick from 1869 to 1872.

In 1872 he was appointed a Lord of Session under the judicial title Lord Shand, a post he held until 1890, when he was sworn of the Privy Council. Two years later he was made a Lord of Appeal in Ordinary and raised to the peerage as Baron Shand, of Woodhouse in the County of Dumfries. He also sat on the Judicial Committee of the Privy Council.

Personal life

Lord Shand married Emily Merelina, daughter of John Clark Meymott, in 1857. There were no children from the marriage. He died in March 1904, aged 75, when the barony became extinct.

References

1828 births
1904 deaths
Barons in the Peerage of the United Kingdom
Members of the Privy Council of the United Kingdom
Members of the Judicial Committee of the Privy Council
Alumni of the University of Edinburgh
Shand
Scottish sheriffs
19th-century Scottish judges
Peers of the United Kingdom created by Queen Victoria